"Shadowside" is a single from the A-ha album Foot of the Mountain. It was released as the third single from the album in the UK and as the second single in Europe (where "Nothing Is Keeping You Here" was the third single). The German physical release of the single includes a demo of the album track "Mother Nature Goes to Heaven".

Track listing

German Physical Release

"Shadowside" (New Single Version) - 3:31
"Mother Nature Goes to Heaven" (Demo Version) - 4:34

UK Download Release

"Shadowside" (New Single Version) - 3:31
"Shadowside" (Album Version) - 4:54

Chart positions
 #22 (GER)
 #73 (AUT)
 #86 (EU)
 #98 (UN)

Music video 

The music video was shot in Germany by director Uwe Flade and made commercially available on a German special edition of Foot of the Mountain.

References

2009 singles
A-ha songs
Songs written by Paul Waaktaar-Savoy
Universal Music Group singles
2009 songs